Ain is a département of France.

Ain or AIN may also refer to:

Language
Ainu language (ISO-639 alpha-3 code AIN)

Medical
Anal intraepithelial neoplasia, a precursor to anal cancer
Anterior interosseous nerve serving the forearm
Acute interstitial nephritis, nephritis affecting the interstitium of the kidneys

People

Given name
Ain (given name), a common Estonian masculine given name.

Surname
Gregory Ain (1908–1988), American architect
Kenneth B. Ain, American endocrinologist and author

Fictional
Ain (mythology), an Irish mythological figure

Places
Ain (Bible), a biblical city
‘Ain Dawwah, one of the springs of Wadi Bani Khalid, Oman
Ain (river), a river in eastern France
Al Ain, a city in the United Arab Emirates
Ain, Iran, a village in Qazvin Province, Iran
Aín, a town in eastern Spain
Ain, Lucknow, a village in Uttar Pradesh, India
El Ain (disambiguation), several places

Culture
Ain (film), a Malayalam-language Indian film
Autonomous Individuals Network, formerly known as Thee Temple ov Psychick Youth

Sports
Al Ain Club, a football club in the United Arab Emirates

Business
Albany International, an American industrial goods company whose stock trades under the AIN ticker symbol
Advanced Intelligent Network in mobile telecoms
Aviation International News, an aviation media
American Independent Network, a TV network
Aintree railway station, Liverpool, England (code: AIN)
Advanced Intelligent Network (AIN) – Variant of Intelligent Network, telecommunications network architecture

Science
Aluminium nitride
Epsilon Tauri or Ain, an orange giant star

See also
Ain Soph
Ayn (disambiguation)
Al Ain (disambiguation)
El Ain (disambiguation)